László Povázsai (10 November 1937 – 21 October 2010) was a Hungarian footballer who played as a forward.

Career 
He was born in Bucharest, Romania but he moved to Hungary with his family as teenager. His first club in the Hungarian league was Csepel SC where he stayed from 1955 until 1960, winning the 1959 Hungarian title. Povázsai László then signed for MTK playing in the Inter-Cities Fairs Cup. His last club was BKV Előre where he finished his career in 1970.After retiring from football he coached Bp.Spartacus in the 1976–1977 season.

References

External links
 

1937 births
2010 deaths
Hungarian footballers
Hungary international footballers
Association football forwards
Hungarian football managers
MTK Budapest FC players
Csepel SC footballers
Footballers from Bucharest
Hungary youth international footballers